Ilocano has two number systems: one is native and the other is derived from Spanish. The systems are virtually used interchangeably. Yet, the situation can dictate which system is preferred.

Typically, Ilocanos use native numbers for one through 10, and Spanish numbers for amounts of 10 and higher. 

Specific time is told using the Spanish system and numbers for hours and minutes, for example, Alas dos/A las dos (2 o'clock).

For dates, cardinal Spanish numbers are the norm; for example, 12 (dose) ti Julio/Hulio (the twelfth of July).

As with other roots in the language, numbers can undergo various forms of agglutination.

Cardinal
Cardinal numbers are those used in counting.

Numbers are connected to their nouns using the ligature a/nga.

 maysa a botelia one bottle
 innem a riwriw a tao six million people

Ordinal
To form the ordinal number (second, third, etc.), except for first, maika- is prefixed to the cardinal form. Note the exceptional forms for third, fourth and sixth.

Aggregate
With the group numbers (pulo, gasut, ribo, laksa and riwriw), infixing in indicates division.

Aggregate numbers have already been introduced: sangapulo, sangaribo, etc. Each is prefixed with sanga-. To form other groups, other numbers, and units of length, time or capacity can be used with sanga-. The alternate form is sangka-.

Distributive
Distributives are formed by prefixing sag- plus reduplication of the first CV (light reduplication) of the cardinal form or the unit. Distributives express so many each, so many a piece. Note the irregular forms for one each, three each, four each and six each.

 Saggatlokami. We take three each.
 Sagdodoliarda. They are one dollar each.

When used with pami(n)-, sagpami(n)-, the result is a distributive multiplicative: so many times each.

 Sagpaminduakami a napan a nabuya diay sine. We each saw the movie twice.

Indefinite
Indefinite numbers are formed by prefixing sumag- and CV reduplication of the first syllable of the cardinal form. In addition, to the cardinal numbers, sumag- can be used with the interrogative mano How much/many?.

Limitative
Limitatives express no more, no less than what the root number or aggregate specifies. It is formed by reduplicating the CVC (heavy reduplication) of the first syllable of the cardinal number or root form.
sanga-/sangka- may be reduplicated, sangsanga-/sangsangka-, also to express limitation.

 Sangsangaigup ti nainumko I drank one gulp.

Multiplicative
These adverbial numbers are formed by prefixing mami(n)- to the cardinal form. Note the forms for once, twice, three times/thrice. Perfect form: nami(n)-.

 Maminduakanto a mapan. You will go twice.
 Mamimpitok a nabuya. I've watched it seven times.

The multiplicatives can be limited by maminpi-/mamipin- (Perf: naminpi-/namipin-).

The multiplicatives can be made ordinal with kapami(n)-. The resulting form is treated as a nominal and takes ergative agents.

 Kapaminlimana ti agbuya iti dayta a pelikula.
 This is her fifth time to see that film.

Nakapamin- prefixed to numbers behaves as an adverb.

 Nakapaminduana nga agpadawat iti kuarta.
 He solicited twice for money.

Fractional
The denominator in fractions is prefixed by pagka-. Numbers such as sangapulo ten, sangagasut hundred, etc. drop the sanga- prefix before taking the prefix.

 maysa a pagkatlo one third
 lima a pagkagasut 5 percent

Divisional
Divisional numbers are formed by prefixing agka- and denote into how many parts something is divided. The perfective is nagka-.

 Agkawalonto ti "apple pie". The apple pie will be divided into eight (pieces).
 Nagkawalo ti "apple pie". The apple pie was divided into eight (pieces).

See also
Ilocano language
Languages of the Philippines

Notes

Numbers
Numbers
Numerals